Endre Nordli is a Norwegian handball player.

He made his debut on the Norwegian national team in 1999, and played 11 matches for the national team. He competed at the 1999 World Men's Handball Championship.

References

Year of birth missing (living people)
Living people
Norwegian male handball players